Vaires–Torcy is a railway station in Vaires-sur-Marne, Seine-et-Marne, Île-de-France, France. The station opened in 1898 and is on the Paris–Strasbourg railway and the start of the LGV Est. The station is served by Transilien Line P (East Paris) services operated by SNCF.

History
Between 2001 and 2003 the station was rebuilt to make way for the LGV Est, which included the building of new entrances to the station.

Train services
The station is served by the following service(s):

Regional services (Transilien Line P) Paris-Est–Meaux

Bus services
The station is also served by bus companies:
 Apolo7 lines 2, 6 and 8
 Seine-et-Marne Express line 19
 PEP'S line 25
 RATP Group lines 211 and 421
 Noctilien night line N141

Gallery

External links

 
Île-de-France Network Map
Transilien website

Railway stations in Seine-et-Marne
Railway stations in France opened in 1898